Robert Lee Chapple (born June 25, 1989) is an American football quarterback for the Atlanta Havoc of the American Arena League (AAL). He signed with the Colorado Ice as an undrafted free agent in 2012. He played college football at the University of North Alabama after transferring out of Georgia Southern University.

Professional career
After failing to make the Colorado Ice following their mini-camp, Chapple was signed by the Nebraska Danger of the Indoor Football League (IFL). Chapple played a few games with the Danger, before signing with the Columbus Lions of the Professional Indoor Football League (PIFL). After a few games with the Lions, Chapple was assigned to the Jacksonville Sharks of the Arena Football League (AFL).

Chapple returned to indoor football in 2014, signing with the Omaha Beef of the Champions Professional Indoor Football League (CPIFL). Shortly after the season started, Chapple signed with the Nashville Venom (of the PIFL) due to their flurry of injuries and quarterbacks signing with other leagues. Chapple himself would join that list, once again being assigned to the Sharks, where he finished out the 2014 season backing up R. J. Archer.

Chapple returned to the Sharks for the start of the 2015 season and was the backup to Tommy Grady.

Chapple signed with the Atlanta Havoc for the 2018 season.

AFL statistics

Stats from ArenaFan:

References

External links
North Alabama Lions bio
Arena Football League bio

1989 births
Living people
American football quarterbacks
Georgia Southern Eagles football players
North Alabama Lions football players
Colorado Crush (IFL) players
Nebraska Danger players
Columbus Lions players
Jacksonville Sharks players
Omaha Beef players
Nashville Venom players
American Arena League players
Players of American football from Georgia (U.S. state)
People from Alpharetta, Georgia
Sportspeople from Fulton County, Georgia